Shahrak-e Khalilabad (also Romanized as Shahrak-e Khalīlābād; also known as Khalīlābāb and Khalīlābād) is a village in Khosuyeh Rural District, in the Central District of Zarrin Dasht County, Fars Province, Iran. At the 2006 census, its population was 1,171, in 262 families.

References 

Populated places in Zarrin Dasht County